Senator Harrington may refer to:

Dan Harrington (politician) (born 1938), Montana State Senate
David C. Harrington (born 1954),  Maryland State Senate
J. J. Harrington (1919–2008), North Carolina State Senate
John Harrington (American politician) (born 1956), Minnesota State Senate
Kathy Harrington (born 1958), North Carolina State Senate
Kevin B. Harrington (1929–2008), Massachusetts State Senate